Asterix and the Power of the Gods is a 1995 platform game for the Sega Mega Drive based on the comic book series Asterix, most notably Asterix and the Chieftain's Shield.

Plot
In Gaul (where France would be today), the leader of the Gauls - Vercingetorix - was defeated by Julius Caesar and his Roman army. The shield was lost to the invading Romans and Asterix must liberate the shield from their control.

Gameplay
Players must guide Asterix through different levels. An isometric map is used to enter different levels. Asterix has the ability to run, jump, and defeat enemies by directly hitting them.

Players can talk to non-player characters just like in a role-playing game. Other people's houses can also be visited in search of clues.

Reception

See also
List of Asterix games

References

External links

1995 video games
Video games based on Asterix
Core Design games
Platform games
Video games set in the Roman Empire
Sega Genesis games
Sega Genesis-only games
Video games developed in the United Kingdom
Video games scored by Nathan McCree
Single-player video games